Anbulla Malare is a 1984 Indian Tamil-language film directed by B. R. Ravishankar and produced by V. V. Babu. The film stars Vijay Menon and Shanthi Krishna. It was released on 11 May 1984.

Plot

Cast 
Vijay Menon
Shanthi Krishna

Soundtrack 
The music was composed by Ilaiyaraaja.

Reception

References

External links 
 

1980 films
1980s Tamil-language films
1984 films
Films scored by Ilaiyaraaja